François Nicolas Baron Fagel (3 February 1655, in Nijmegen – 23 February 1718, in Sluis) was an infantry general serving the Dutch Republic. He was a nephew of Gaspar Fagel and took part in many battles during his career. He played an important role in battles such as the Siege of Bonn, the Battle of Malplaquet and the Siege of Bouchain. He was the son of Nicolaas Fagal, mayor of Nijmegen, and Elisabeth Robbé.

Franco-Dutch War and Nine Years' War
Fagel Entered military service at a young age. He served as ensign at Maastricht since 1672; after the siege of that fortress a year later, the Prince of Waldeck promoted him to captain as a reward for his brave conduct. In the battle of Séneffe in 1674, where he was part of Prince Maurice's regiment, he was captured. William III of Orange, promoted him to lieutenant-colonel and captain of the Dutch Blue Guards and in 1679 to colonel of the Lavergne regiment, after participating in four campaigns. 

Shortly before the  expedition to England in 1688, he was promoted to brigadier. Later he served in Flanders and distinguished himself in the Battle of Fleurus. Fagel achieved greater fame in 1691 by defending Mons, under the supreme command of the Prince of Grimberghen, against close to 100,000 Frenchmen under Boufflers and Vauban; due to civilian pressure, the city was surrendered in spite of the strong resistance of the garrison. At Battle of Steenkerque, in 1692, Fagel commanded seven Dutch battalions; in the Battle of Landen he fought on the left wing and managed to drive back the enemy at Neerlanden with his troops, supported by Danish troops. Promoted to major-general by King William, he participated with great distinction in the Siege of Namur; with 3 Dutch regiments he was in charge of the attack on the works at the St. Nicolas Gate; during an attack by the French on the night of 12-13 July, Fagel was seriously injured.

War of the Spanish Succession
Promoted to lieutenant general shortly afterwards, he helped to save Nijmegen in 1702 under the Earl of Athlone. The same year he led the English storming of the covered road of Venlo, supported by Lottum's Prussian Troops which would later result in the capitulalion of Venlo. At the storming of Liège, it was the Dutch, English and Prussian battalions, under Fagel and Somerfield, who decided the battle in favour of the Allies. At the Siege of Bonn under the leadership of Menno van Coehoorn, Fagel was one of the sub-commanders, with Obdam, Dedem and Pallandt. In the Battle of Ekeren, that same year, Fagel was wounded twice.

In 1704 and 1705 he commanded the Dutch and English troops in Portugal as field marshal together with the Earl of Galway. They captured Valencia de Alcántara in May, soon followed by the capture of Albuquerque. Lack of support and co-operation, inexperienced troops, badly trained cavalry, opposition from the local population and pro-French Spanish statesmen forced him to abandon the Siege of Badajoz; regretting this, he asked to be recalled, but for the time being remained in Iberia. However, when in his opinion the leadership of the military operations became worse and worse, he left for the Dutch Republic in November 1705, after being elevated to grande by the king of Portugal. 

In 1706 he took part in the Battle of Ramillies and helped to capture Ostend under Hendrik van Nassau-Ouwerkerk. The also took part in the Battle of Wijnendale in 1708 and the Battle of Malplaquet in 1709. During the Battle of Malplaquet he, together with the Prince of Orange, led the infamous Dutch assault which caused enormous casualties among them. He played an important role during the Siege of Tournai the same year and the Siege of Béthune a year later in collaboration with Prussian general Schulenburg, of whom Fagel was very fond. At the Siege of Bouchain in 1711, Fagel enjoyed supreme command at the express command of the Duke of Marlborough. Marlbourogh refused any negotiations, so that Bouchain, which was under the command of de Ravignan, had to surrender on mercy or disfavour and its garrison thus became prisoners of war. Fagel seems to have thought more leniently about this, but in any case gained great fame by capturing this strong town within 23 days, despite the fact that the French were defending it excellently and a strong army was on its way to relieve it. In May 1712, he took up a fortified position along the Scheldt between Neuville and Hordain; after the peace of Utrecht, he was appointed governor of Sluis in 1713.

Sources

Dictionnaire Bouillet

People from Nijmegen
1718 deaths
1655 births
Dutch generals
Dutch army commanders in the War of the Spanish Succession
17th-century Dutch military personnel
18th-century Dutch military personnel
Dutch military personnel of the Nine Years' War